Chamberlayne Gardens is a historic apartment complex located in Richmond, Virginia.  The complex was built in 1945–1946, and consists of 52 Colonial Revival style brick buildings, attached in 16 groups.  They have four building plans, are two to three stories in height and contain a total of 216 one- and two-bedroom apartments. The buildings alternate in either red or buff-colored brick, and have either a gabled slate roof (most common) or a flat roof with
parapet ends capped with the original tile.  The complex was designed by Norfolk architect Bernard Betzig Spigel and built under the auspices of the Federal Housing Administration.

It was listed on the National Register of Historic Places in 2007.

References

Residential buildings on the National Register of Historic Places in Virginia
Colonial Revival architecture in Virginia
Residential buildings completed in 1946
Buildings and structures in Richmond, Virginia
National Register of Historic Places in Richmond, Virginia